The Sawatch Range  or Saguache Range is a high and extensive mountain range in central Colorado which includes eight of the twenty highest peaks in the Rocky Mountains, including Mount Elbert, at  elevation, the highest peak in the Rockies.

The range forms a part of the Continental Divide, and its eastern side drains into the headwaters of the Arkansas River. The western side of the range feeds the headwaters of the Roaring Fork River, the Eagle River, and the Gunnison River, tributaries of the Colorado River.

The Sawatch mountains in general are high, massive, and relatively gentle in contour.  While some peaks are rugged enough to require technical climbing, most can be climbed by a simple, yet arduous hike. Notable summits include Mount Elbert, Mount Massive, La Plata Peak, Mount of the Holy Cross, and the Collegiate Peaks (Mounts Columbia, Harvard, Princeton, Yale, Belford, and Oxford).

State Highway 82 traverses the range at Independence Pass (Colorado). It is also traversed by Cottonwood Pass, which connects the town of Buena Vista with Gunnison County. Hagerman Pass is another pass to the north, connecting the Arkansas Headwaters near Leadville with the upper valley of the Fryingpan River. Hagerman Pass is traversable with four-wheel drive vehicles and on foot during summer and early autumn months. The range contains numerous hiking trails within the San Isabel National Forest and White River National Forest.


Prominent peaks

See also

Southern Rocky Mountains
Missouri Lakes Trail
Collegiate Peaks

References

External links

Sawatch Range @ Peakbagger
Sawatch Range @ 14ers.com
Sawatch Range @ summitpost.org
Mt. Aetna @ summitpost.org

Mountain ranges of Colorado
Ranges of the Rocky Mountains
Landforms of Gunnison County, Colorado
Landforms of Lake County, Colorado
Landforms of Chaffee County, Colorado
Landforms of Eagle County, Colorado
Landforms of Saguache County, Colorado
San Isabel National Forest